Ampelonas (Greek: Αμπελώνας), may refer to several places in Greece:

Ampelonas, a municipal unit in the Larissa regional unit
Ampelonas, Elis, a village in the municipality of Pyrgos, Elis
Ampelonas, Thesprotia, a village in the municipality of Filiates